Wair is a locality in India. Wair's railway station code is WAIR.

See also
 Suraj Mal of Bharatpur

Villages in Bharatpur district